is a single-member electoral district for the House of Representatives, the lower house of the National Diet of Japan.

The district is located in the prefecture (-dō) of Hokkaidō and represents the municipalities within Hokkaido's Sorachi and Rumoi subprefectures, as well as the towns of Horokanai (formerly within Sorachi, now a part of Kamikawa Subprefecture) and Horonobe (formerly within Rumoi, now a part of Sōya Subprefecture).

History

The district was created in 1994 when the current system of single-member districts was introduced and first contested in the 1996 general election. It was formed from portions of the former 2nd and 4th districts that had existed under the multi-member system since 1947. In 1996 the seat was won by Democratic Party of Japan member Tadamasa Kodaira, who had been one of the representatives of the former 4th district since 1990. Kodaira retained the seat at the following four elections, until his loss to Komeito candidate  at the 2012 general election. Inatsu has retained the seat in subsequent elections.

List of representatives

Recent results

References 

Politics of Hokkaido
Districts of the House of Representatives (Japan)